Joseph Samuel Kendall (born 2 December 1996) is an English former first-class cricketer.

Kendall was born at Leicester in December 1996. He was educated at Oakham School, before going up to Loughborough University. While studying at Loughborough, he played two first-class cricket matches for Loughborough MCCU against Leicestershire and Kent in 2019. He scored 95 runs in his two matches, with a high score of 37 not out. In addition to playing first-class cricket, Kendall has also played minor counties cricket for Lincolnshire.

References

External links

1996 births
Living people
Cricketers from Leicester
People educated at Oakham School
Alumni of Loughborough University
English cricketers
Lincolnshire cricketers
Loughborough MCCU cricketers